Jerry Bruce Jenkins (born September 23, 1949) is an American writer. He is best known for the Left Behind series, written with Tim LaHaye. Jenkins has written more than 200 books, in multiple genres, such as biography, self-help, romance, mystery, and young adult fiction. Nineteen of his 130+ novels have explored eschatological themes and settings.

In 2016, Jenkins was described as a dispensationalist Christian by The Washington Post.

Early life 
Jenkins was born September  1949 to Harry Philip Jenkins and Bonita Grace Thompson of Kalamazoo, Michigan. In a 2008 interview with The Modesto Bee, Jenkins said his Christian faith was inspired by a Warner Sallman painting, guided by his mother. After graduating from Forest View High School, Jenkins attended Moody Bible Institute from 1967 to 1968, and Harper College from 1968 to 1970.

Career 
After suffering an injury playing sports, Jenkins began work as a sports reporter while he was still in high school. Before he could drive, Jenkins covered high school sports for local newspapers. While attending Moody Bible Institute, Jenkins served as night news editor for the institute's flagship radio station, WMBI-FM.

He served as Vice President of the Moody's publishing division from 1985 to 1988, and a writer-in-residence from 1988 onward. He was the managing editor of Moody Monthly from 1974 to 1979 and publisher from 1979 to 1981. Jenkins served as a member of Moody Bible Institute's Board of Trustees from 2001 to 2018.

, Jenkins has written more than 200 books, including twenty-one New York Times bestsellers. His work has appeared in Time, Reader's Digest, Parade, and Guideposts. More than one hundred titles by Jenkins are young adult fiction, written in eleven series, including the forty-volume Left Behind: The Kids (1998–2003) series.

From 2011 to 2017, Jenkins owned the Christian Writers Institute's Christian Market Writer's Guide.

As co-writer 
Jenkins has written twenty as-told-to biographies and memoirs of prominent athletes and religious leaders, such as Hank Aaron, Bill Gaither, Walter Payton, Joe Gibbs, Mike Singletary, and Sammy Tippit. Jenkins called those titles his "sports personality" books. His credit as writer is given via an "as told to", "as told by", or "with Jerry B. Jenkins" attribution. 

In an interview with Joanna Penn of The Creative Penn podcast, Jenkins explained he does not co-write, saying "if my name is on [the book] … I wrote every word." For works credited with Chris Fabry, such as The Wormlings (2007–08) series, Jenkins functioned as the editor, and Fabry was the sole writer. Jenkins said co-writing a book "is a nightmare," but can be successful if the roles among the credited writers are settled before hand. His collaboration with Billy Graham resulted in In His Own Words (2018), published by Tyndale House, for which Jenkins received sole writing credit.

Gil Thorp 
The Dallas O'Neil and The Baker Street Sports Club (1986) series, and its follow up, the Dallas O'Neil Mysteries (1988–89), prompted Gil Thorp creator Jack Berrill to open discussions with Jenkins on creating a line of young adult books about Gil Thorp and the athletes at the fictional Milford High School. The Gil Thorp series was never realized, but following Berrill's death in 1996, Jenkins was recruited by Tribune to continue to comic strip as its writer, with Rod Whigham as artist. During his tenure as writer, Jenkins introduced a number of controversial storylines, including a young shomer Shabbat joining the Milford football team, and a teen pregnancy story criticized as anti-abortion.

Jenkins's sons, Chad and Dallas, contributed to Gil Thorp by developing scenarios for their father to write. According to the Chicago Reader, Chad Jenkins wrote the strip from 2001 to 2004 without credit, which both Jenkins and his son say is not true. Chad served as a story consultant.

Christian Writers Guild 
In 1965, Norman Rohrer established the Christian Writers Guild (CWG). Rohrer offered a 48-part correspondence course intended to teach the craft of writing, as well as history and theology Rohrer believed were necessary to improve the quality of fiction and non-fiction writing intended for the Christian market. In 2001, Jenkins purchased the CWG, and Rohrer remained on staff as "Dean of Instruction". CWG transitioned from mail-based delivery, to an online platform. Jenkins recruited many of his friends and fellow writers to function as mentors to CWG members, and to expand the guild's offerings. In 2013, Jenkins developed the Christian Writers Guild Press intended to publish original works by CWG members. Jenkins was criticized for creating a "vanity press", despite lambasting such publishing schemes in the past and closed the operation before contracting with any writers.

According to literary agent Chip MacGregor, of MacGregor & Luedeke, Jenkins "was ready to return to his primary occupation and calling, that of full-time writing" by early-2014. Jenkins dissolved CWG in late-2014, which resulted in heavy criticism of both Jenkins and the CWG. Dennis E. Hensley told Christianity Today that Jenkins and the CWG had offered a "great service to developing writers." CWG's staff and mission were absorbed into a new organization called BelieversTrust, which operated until 2016.

Since 2016, Jenkins has taught an online writing course via his own platform, Jerry Jenkins Writers Guild.

Left Behind 

Jenkins and co-author LaHaye of the Left Behind series were profiled in a May 24, 2004 cover story in Newsweek magazine entitled "The New Prophets of Revelation". LaHaye, who conceived the series, handled the theological underpinnings of his end-of-the-world series, while Jenkins handled the writing. The Left Behind series includes 16 books which have sold over 63 million copies worldwide.

In 2018, Left Behind series was ranked  77 in The Great American Read poll sponsored by PBS.

Personal life 
Jenkins and his wife Dianna (née Whiteford), whom he married in 1971, reside in Black Forest, Colorado. He is the father of Dallas Jenkins, creator of The Chosen web television series; Chad Jenkins, the Sports Information Director at MidAmerica Nazarene University; and Michael Bruce Jenkins.

When asked about his Christian denomination, Jenkins has often answered "Jesus Christ". Alissa Wilkinson, of Christian Today, described Jenkins as a dispensationalist Christian in an editorial for The Washington Post.

Bibliography

Non-fiction

Co-written works 
Jenkins wrote the following memoirs and autobiographical works in which he received an "as told by" or "with Jerry B. Jenkins" attribution.

Fiction

Margo Mystery (1979–1984) 
A Margo Mystery series was published by Moody. The first novel, Margo (1979), was published by Jeremy Books, but later reprinted by Moody.

Jennifer Grey Mystery (1983–1985) 
A Jennifer Grey Mystery series was published by Victor Books.

The Soon Trilogy (2003–2005) 
The Soon Trilogy was published by Tyndale House.

Jesus Chronicles (2007–2010) 
The Jesus Chronicles series, written with Tim LaHaye, is a narrative retelling of the four canonical gospels. Published by Penguin's Putnam Adult imprint. Reprints from Center Point assigned numbers to the novels.

Precinct 11 (2011–12) 
The Precinct 11 novels were published by Tyndale House.

Dead Sea Chronicles (2018–2020) 
The Dead Sea Chronicles series is based on and inspired by the work of Craig A. Evans. Published by Worthy.

Young adult fiction 
Below is an incomplete list:

Tara Chadwick (1984) 
The Tara Chadwick Series was published by Moody in 1984. Reprinted in 1992, including new cover art and formatting.

Bradford Family (1984–1986) 
The Bradford Family Adventures series was originally published by Stanford Publishing, in 1984. Reprinted by Moody in 1990.

Dallas O'Neil (1986) 
The Dallas O'Neil and the Baker Street Sports Club series was published by Moody in 1986.

Dallas O'Neil Mysteries (1988–89) 
The Dallas O'Neil Mysteries series is a sequel to the Dallas O'Neil and the Baker Street Sports Club (1986) series. Also published by Moody.

Toby Andrews (1996) 
The Toby Andrews and the Junior Deputies series was published by Moody.

Global Air Troubleshooters (1996) 

The Global Air Troubleshooters series was published by Multnomah Books in 1996. Reprinted as AirQuest Adventures by Zondervan in 2006.

Red Rock Mysteries (2005–06) 
The Red Rock Mysteries series was written by Chris Fabry and edited by Jenkins. Published by Tyndale House. The series was reprinted in 2020, including new cover art and new text.

Renegade Spirit (2006–2008) 
The Renegade Spirit series was written by John Perrodin and edited by Jenkins. Published by Thomas Nelson's Integrity imprint. The premise is similar to The Soon Trilogy (2003–2005), written by Jenkins.

The Wormlings (2007–08) 
The Wormlings series was written by Chris Fabry and edited by Jenkins. Published by Tyndale House.

Thirteen (2016–17) 
The Thirteen science fantasy series was written by Trisha White Priebe and edited by Jenkins. Published by Barbour.

Left Behind (1995–2007) 

The Left Behind series, created and developed by Tim LaHaye, was published by Tyndale House. Thorndike Press, Turtleback Books, and others, offered reprints in various formats. Graphic novel adaptations of the series were published by Tyndale from 2001 to 2002. Tyndale also published devotional calendars for 2002 and 2003 which featured text from the novels. Prior to the release of Soul Harvest (1998), the novels were not numbered. Not all printings include a number stamp.

Prequel series (2005–06) 
Marketed as Before They Were Left Behind, the series retells events prior Left Behind (1995). The novels also function as prequels to Kingdom Come (2007), the final installment of the main series.

Kids (1998–2003) 

Left Behind: The Kids is a retelling of the main series from the point of view of four young survivors. The novellas were bound-up as the Young Trib Force (2003–2005) series. Reprints include updated text introduced in the Young Trib Force bind-ups.

Non-fiction companions (1999–2005) 
Jenkins co-wrote three companions with Tim LaHaye. Are We Living in the End Times? (1999) was not marketed as a Left Behind title; however, the book explored themes and settings depicted in the novels. These Will Not Be Left Behind (2003) is a retrospective of reader's experiences with the series, and how they "came to faith." Reprints of the companions use the same cover design and typeface as the main series.

Young Trib Force (2003–2005) 
Left Behind: The Young Trib Force bind-ups of The Kids (1998–2003) series, three or four novellas per volume. Chris Fabry wrote new material to link the novellas to the main sequence of novels. Several bind-ups included significant revisions to the original text, including reordering of events and character changes.

Notes

References

External links 
 
 Jerry B. Jenkins at Tyndale House

1949 births
Living people
20th-century American biographers
20th-century American male writers
20th-century American novelists
20th-century apocalypticists
20th-century Baptists
21st-century American biographers
21st-century American male writers
21st-century American novelists
21st-century apocalypticists
21st-century Baptists
American male biographers
American male novelists
Baptists from Colorado
Baptists from Michigan
Baptist writers
Christian novelists
Critics of the Catholic Church
Novelists from Michigan